The pharyngeal nerve is a small branch of the maxillary nerve, arising from the posterior part of the pterygopalatine ganglion. 

It passes through the palatovaginal canal with the pharyngeal branch of the maxillary artery, and is distributed to the mucous membrane of the nasal part of the pharynx, behind the auditory tube.

See also
 Pharyngeal branch of vagus nerve

References

External links

Trigeminal nerve